Rings on Her Fingers is a 1942 American comedy film directed by Rouben Mamoulian and starring Henry Fonda and Gene Tierney. The screenplay concerns a poor man who gets mistaken for a millionaire and is swindled out of his life savings.

Plot
Susan Miller (Gene Tierney) works as a girdle salesgirl in a large department store. She dreams of living on "the other side", among the rich. An elderly woman, calling herself Mrs. Maybelle Worthington (Spring Byington), comes to buy some underwear. She is actually a professional swindler. Her partner Warren (Laird Cregar) meets her at the department store, and reports that her "daughter" (a partner in their schemes) has run away to get married. They notice that Susan resembles the "daughter", and ask her to impersonate the missing girl at their party that evening. Susan sees an opportunity to experience life among the rich, and wear the expensive clothes she could never afford.

From that day on, Susan becomes "Linda Worthington" and accompanies "Mother Worthington" and "Uncle Warren" in their travels. They use her to attract marriageable young rich men, whom they swindle. One day in Southern California, they encounter John Wheeler (Henry Fonda), and overhear his plan to buy a yacht for $15,000. They take him for a millionaire, and use "Linda" to lure him into one of their swindles. But John is actually an accountant, who has carefully saved the $15,000 out of his limited income. This time Susan/Linda falls in love with the intended victim, and it's hard for them to find their way to happiness.

Cast
 Henry Fonda as John Wheeler
 Gene Tierney as Susan Miller / "Linda Worthington"
 Laird Cregar as Warren
 Spring Byington as Mrs. Maybelle Worthington
 Shepperd Strudwick as Tod Fenwick (as John Shepperd)
 Frank Orth as Kellogg
 Henry Stephenson as Colonel Prentiss
 Marjorie Gateson as Mrs. Fenwick
 George Lessey as Fenwick Sr.
 Iris Adrian as Peggy
 Harry Hayden as Conductor
 Clara Blandick as Mrs. Beasley
 Charles C. Wilson as Captain Hurley
 Gwendolyn Logan as Miss Calahan

Reception
The film recorded a loss of $14,100.

References

External links 
 
 
 

1942 films
1942 romantic comedy films
1940s screwball comedy films
20th Century Fox films
American black-and-white films
American crime comedy films
American romantic comedy films
American screwball comedy films
Films about con artists
Films directed by Rouben Mamoulian
Films scored by Cyril J. Mockridge
Films scored by Leigh Harline
Films set in California
Films set in Connecticut
1940s American films